Richard Anthony Razzano (born January 28, 1981) is a former National Football League fullback.  He was drafted by the Tampa Bay Buccaneers in 2005.

Razzano played college football for the Ole Miss Rebels. His father, Rick Razzano, also played in the National Football League.

Razzano has owned and operated a gym called Pain Train Fitness since 2008.

References

External links
NFL profile

1981 births
Living people
People from Milford, Ohio
American football running backs
Ole Miss Rebels football players
Tampa Bay Buccaneers players